The Manchurian Candidate is a 2004 American neo-noir psychological political 
thriller film   directed by Jonathan Demme. The film, based on Richard Condon's 1959 novel of the same name and a reworking of the previous 1962 film, stars Denzel Washington as Bennett Marco, a tenacious, virtuous soldier, Liev Schreiber as Raymond Shaw, a U.S. Representative from New York, manipulated into becoming a vice-presidential candidate, Jon Voight as U.S. Senator Tom Jordan, a challenger for Vice President, and Meryl Streep as Eleanor Prentiss Shaw, also a U.S. Senator and the manipulative, ruthless mother of Raymond Shaw.

While the name of the novel and the earlier film was retained, the significance of "Manchurian" was changed. In the original, the protagonist was captured in the Korean War and brainwashed by the Chinese in the actual Manchuria. In the 2004 film, with the Korean War replaced by the Gulf War, Manchurian is used, instead, as the name of a sinister multinational company.

Plot
Major Bennett Marco commanded a famed U.S. Army unit during a Gulf War raid in 1991. For his role in that mission, Sergeant First Class Raymond Shaw was awarded the Medal of Honor for single-handedly defeating the enemy and rescuing all but two of his men. By 2008, the U.S. has become dominated by xenophobia, de facto martial law, environmental degradation, and increasing corporate influence; Shaw is now a U.S. congressman. His ruthless mother, Virginia Senator Eleanor Prentiss Shaw, uses her influence to secure his nomination as the vice-presidential candidate over the favorite, Senator Tom Jordan. Raymond is shy and withdrawn, but opens up to his mother and his childhood sweetheart Jocelyn, Senator Jordan's daughter.

Al Melvin, one of Marco's former soldiers, tells Marco of his confusing memories and dreams about their lost army unit. Though clearly mentally ill, he shows Marco his drawings of images from his dreams. Soon, Marco also dreams about the raid, where Raymond and he are captured and brainwashed to kill members of their platoon. Their captors included scientists led by a mysterious South African man.

Marco starts investigating what really happened. He travels to New York City: on the train he meets an outgoing supermarket clerk who had already identified him earlier, named Rosie. She offers him a place to stay in New York. While showering at her apartment, Marco feels a small lump on his upper back. He uses a knife to dig at the spot, and pulls out a tiny metallic object, but accidentally drops it down the bathroom sink drain after Rosie, having listened to Marco's subtle sounds of distress, forces her way inside.

Marco confronts Raymond at campaign headquarters, wrestles him down, and bites into his back to remove the same implant he suspects is there. The implant is analyzed and is a nanotechnological experiment connected with Manchurian Global, a powerful private equity firm with major political connections, including Eleanor. Researching the firm, Marco recognizes the South African man from his nightmares as geneticist-turned-mercenary Dr. Atticus Noyle. He brings his findings to Senator Jordan, who confronts the Shaws and suggests that Raymond withdraw from the campaign. Instead, Eleanor "activates" Raymond and orders him to kill Jordan. Jocelyn is also killed when she tries to stop Raymond.

Marco suspects he has been followed, and when Marco confronts Rosie, she reveals she works for the FBI, which has been monitoring the conspiracy for years. Having found an implant in Melvin, who—like all of Raymond and Marco's squad-mates—died mysteriously, the FBI arranges a meeting between Marco and Raymond to convince them they were brainwashed under an assassination plot, which takes place just as Governor Arthur and Raymond win the White House. Raymond receives a phone call intended for Marco from Eleanor. Using trigger words, she commands Marco to assassinate the President-elect so that Raymond becomes President and admits that she voluntarily gave him to the brainwashers for the country's benefit; Raymond resists the mind-control techniques, empowered by Jocelyn's death.

At the climactic moment, Raymond deliberately places himself between the entranced Marco and the President-elect. As Rosie rushes through the crowd to find Marco, Raymond looks at the vent where Marco is hiding and nods as a signal to kill the President-elect. Raymond dances with his mother and steers them into the marked position, where Marco kills them both with a single rifle shot. Marco prepares to kill himself, but after seeing Raymond's nod, Rosie arrives and prevents his suicide by wounding him.

The FBI frames a deceased Manchurian Global contractor as the shooter. Manchurian executives watch their entire conspiracy revealed on television, but do not attempt to flee. Rosie takes Marco to the remote island compound where he was conditioned. After reflecting on his time there, Marco drops a photo of his Army unit and Raymond's Medal of Honor into the sea.

Cast

 Denzel Washington as Major Bennett Marco
 Meryl Streep as Senator Eleanor Prentiss Shaw
 Liev Schreiber as Congressman Raymond Prentiss Shaw
 Jon Voight as Senator Thomas Jordan
 Kimberly Elise as Eugenie Rosie
 Vera Farmiga as Jocelyn Jordan
 Jeffrey Wright as Corporal Al Melvin
 Simon McBurney as Atticus Noyle
 Bruno Ganz as Delp
 Adam LeFevre as Congressman Healy
 Ann Dowd as Congresswoman Beckett
 Ted Levine as Lieutenant Colonel Howard
 Miguel Ferrer as Colonel Garret
 Dean Stockwell as Mark Whiting
 Charles Napier as Lieutenant General Sloan
 Jude Ciccolella as David Donovan
 Tom Stechschulte as Governor Robert "Bob" Arthur
 Pablo Schreiber as PFC Eddie Ingram
 Anthony Mackie as PFC Robert Baker III
 Robyn Hitchcock as Laurence Tokar
 Obba Babatundé as Senator Wells
 Željko Ivanek as Vaughn Utly
 John Bedford Lloyd as Jay "J.B." Johnston

Cameos

 Al Franken as a reporter
 Sidney Lumet as a political pundit
 Anna Deavere Smith as a political pundit
 Roy Blount Jr. as a political pundit
 Fred Brathwaite as a political pundit
 Roger Corman as the Secretary of State
 Beau Sia (on a TV screen) as a presenter
 Gayle King (on a TV screen) as a presenter

Production
Tina Sinatra was a co-producer of the film. Her father Frank Sinatra portrayed Marco in the original 1962 film and owned that film's legal distribution rights into the late 1980s, never re-releasing it during that time (although it did air on network television several times). In the original, nationally released during the Cuban Missile Crisis, the premise was based on communists taking control; in this remake, big corporate influence serves as the evil faction, a twist to maintain the "Manchurian connection". The remake does not follow the original film's plot details on several occasions.

Reception

Box office
The Manchurian Candidate was released July 30, 2004, alongside Harold & Kumar Go to White Castle, Thunderbirds, & The Village. The film grossed $65,955,630 in North America and $30,150,334 in other territories, totaling $96,105,964 worldwide.

Critical response
The film received mostly positive reviews from critics. On review aggregator website Rotten Tomatoes, the film has a "Certified Fresh" 80% rating, based on 207 reviews, with an average rating of 7.11/10. The site's consensus reads, "While not the classic its predecessor is, this update is well-acted and conjures a chilling resonance". Metacritic, which assigns a normalized rating out of 100 top reviews from mainstream critics, calculated an average score of 76, based on 41 reviews, indicating "generally favorable reviews". Audiences polled by CinemaScore gave the film an average grade of "B+" on an A+ to F scale.

Mick LaSalle of the San Francisco Chronicle wrote of Streep, "No one can talk about the acting in The Manchurian Candidate without rhapsodizing about Streep (in the role originated by Angela Lansbury). She has the Hillary hair and the Karen Hughes attack-dog energy, but the charm, the inspiration, and the constant invention are her own. She gives us a senator who's a monomaniac, a mad mommy and master politician rolled into one, a woman firing on so many levels that no one can keep up – someone who loves being evil as much as Streep loves acting. She's a pleasure to watch and to marvel at every second she's onscreen."

Accolades

See also

 List of American films of 2004

References

External links

 
 
 
 
 
 
 
 

2004 films
2004 thriller films
2000s American films
2000s English-language films
2000s political thriller films
American neo-noir films
American political thriller films
Films about altered memories
Films about assassinations
Films about fictional presidents of the United States
Films about hypnosis
Films about mind control
Films about mother–son relationships
Films about nanotechnology
Films about presidential elections
Films about the United States Army
Films about veterans
Films based on American thriller novels
Films based on adaptations
Films directed by Jonathan Demme
Films produced by Scott Rudin
Films scored by Rachel Portman
Films set in New York City
Films set in 2008
Films set in the future
Films shot in Jacksonville, Florida
Gulf War films
Incest in film
Paramount Pictures films
Remakes of American films